Bov is a village in Svoge Municipality, Sofia Province, western Bulgaria. The village has a train station called Gara Bov on the train line Sofia - Mezdra located 2 km west of the village. During the years the train station turned into in a separate settlement.

Honours
Bov Point on Brabant Island, Antarctica is named after the village.

References

Villages in Sofia Province